The Unfaithful (Spanish: Las infieles) is a 1953 Mexican drama film directed by Alejandro Galindo and starring Irasema Dilián, Armando Calvo and María Douglas.

Cast

References

Bibliography 
 Mora, Carl J. Mexican Cinema: Reflections of a Society, 1896-2004. McFarland & Co, 2005.

External links 
 

1953 films
1953 drama films
Mexican drama films
1950s Spanish-language films
Films directed by Alejandro Galindo
Mexican black-and-white films
1950s Mexican films